Marcin Matkowski (born 15 January 1981) is a Polish former professional tennis player whose speciality is in doubles. He played college tennis at UCLA, where Jean-Julien Rojer was one of his teammates. Matkowski and Mariusz Fyrstenberg won the Madrid Open twice, in addition to reaching the final at the US Open. The duo also reached the final of the ATP Finals and participated six times at the event overall.

Significant finals

Grand Slam tournament finals

Doubles: 1 (1 runner-up)

Mixed Doubles: 2 (2 runner-ups)

Year-end championships

Doubles: 1 (1 runner-up)

Masters 1000 finals

Doubles: 9 (2 titles, 7 runner-ups)

ATP career finals

Doubles: 48 (18 titles, 30 runner-ups)

Performance timeline

Doubles

References

External links

 
 
 

1981 births
Living people
People from Barlinek
Olympic tennis players of Poland
Polish male tennis players
Tennis players at the 2004 Summer Olympics
Tennis players at the 2008 Summer Olympics
Tennis players at the 2012 Summer Olympics
Tennis players at the 2016 Summer Olympics
Sportspeople from West Pomeranian Voivodeship
UCLA Bruins men's tennis players